The 1964 All-Ireland Senior Hurling Championship Final was the 77th All-Ireland Final and the culmination of the 1964 All-Ireland Senior Hurling Championship, an inter-county hurling tournament for the top teams in Ireland. The match was held at Croke Park, Dublin, on 6 September 1964, between Tipperary and Kilkenny. The Leinster champions lost to their Munster opponents on a score line of 5-13 to 2-8.

Match details

References

All-Ireland Senior Hurling Championship Final
All-Ireland Senior Hurling Championship Final, 1964
All-Ireland Senior Hurling Championship Final
All-Ireland Senior Hurling Championship Finals
Kilkenny GAA matches
Tipperary GAA matches